Shock value is the potential of an action, image, text, or other form of communication to provoke a reaction of disgust, shock, anger, or fear.

Shock Value may also refer to:

 Shock Value (Timbaland album), 2007
 Shock Value II, a 2009 follow-up
 Shock Value (Twelve Gauge Valentine album), 2006
 Shock Value, a book by John Waters
 Shock Value (book), a 2011 book by Jason Zinoman
 Shock Value (film), a 2014 film starring Malcolm McDowell